The Choirboys is an Australian hard rock and Australian pub rock band from Sydney formed as Choirboys in 1979 with mainstays Mark Gable on lead vocals, Ian Hulme on bass guitar, Brad Carr on lead guitar and Lindsay Tebbutt on drums. In preparation for their second album Big Bad Noise in 1988, the band changed their name to The Choirboys. The band line-up saw many changes from 1983 to 2007, while releasing 8 studio albums. Their 1987 single "Run to Paradise" remains their biggest commercial success.

Career

Early years
Choirboys formed in the Northern Beaches area of Sydney as a hard rock pub band in 1979. Original members were Brad Carr on lead guitar, Mark Gable on vocals, Ian Hulme on bass guitar and Lindsay Tebbutt on drums.

In 1983, after one of their demos was sent to Albert Productions record producer George Young (ex-The Easybeats, older brother of Angus and Malcolm Young of AC/DC) they signed to Albert Records. Jim Manzie produced their self-titled debut album, Choirboys, which was released in July. The first single, "Never Gonna Die," followed in August and reached No. 30 on the Australian Kent Music Report Singles Chart. Australian TV and music personality Ian "Molly" Meldrum claimed the album was "destined to become an Aussie classic". They toured as support to The Angels and Rose Tattoo and then Cold Chisel invited Choirboys to support them on their Last Stand Tour. However in November, Gable's vocal cords had ruptured and they were unable to join that tour – they spent 1984 and 1985 in hiatus waiting for him to recover.

1986–89: "Run to Paradise" and Big Bad Noise
Choirboys signed with Mushroom Records and released "Fireworks" in May 1986, they also opened for Deep Purple on their tour of Australia. Brad Carr left the group to be replaced on lead guitar by Brett Williams (ex-Brakes) as they supported Bon Jovi's tour in 1987. They recorded their second album Big Bad Noise with producers Peter Blyton (The Radiators, Machinations) and Brian McGee (The Rolling Stones, Cyndi Lauper). The next single "Run to Paradise" reached No. 3 in December 1987. Released in the United States, it appeared on the Billboard Hot 100 and peaked at No. 33 on the Mainstream Rock chart in 1989. Big Bad Noise peaked at No. 5 on the Kent Music Report Albums Chart in April 1988 and went double platinum. It was ranked No. 21 for the year in Australia. Other singles from the album included "Boys Will Be Boys" and "Struggle Town" reaching No. 14 and No. 34 respectively.

1990s: Midnight Sun to Yo-Yo
The Choirboys recorded Midnight Sun, the follow-up to Big Bad Noise, in Los Angeles with producer Marc Tanner in 1991. While it generated two top 40 hits in "Empire" and "Rendezvous", the album didn't achieve the level of success of its predecessor – it peaked at No. 30. Late in the year they released a live album, Dead Drunk Live Hangovers, recorded at a Melbourne show.

Brad Heaney (ex-The Screaming Jets) replaced Tebbutt on drums and Steve Williams (Wa Wa Nee) replaced Brett Williams on guitar by 1993. Their compilation album Decade 1983–1993 (1993) was followed by Dancing on the Grave of Rock n' Roll (1994), with Barton Price (Models) on drums, which was produced by Gable and Hulme.

The band recorded its next album Yo-Yo in Germany during 1996, with Blyton and Choirboys producing and Richard Lara (The Screaming Jets) replacing Brett Williams on guitar. The band supported Cheap Trick on their Australian tour in the same year with Tony Le Rhodes on drums.

2000–present
The Choirboys recorded the Evolver album in 2002 and 2003 in between going on an extensive tour of Australia and New Zealand. Former Icehouse drummer Paul Wheeler joined the band. The Evolver album was released in 2004 but due to low promotion for the album, it peaked at 174 in the Australian charts. The band returned to the Australian singles charts in Australia in July when dance producer Nick Skitz asked Gable to sing "Run to Paradise" on a dance reworking. The song, billed as "Nick Skitz vs. Choirboys", debuted in the top 20 of the Australian singles charts.

In 2006, The Choirboys performed "Run To Paradise" on the Grand Final edition of The AFL Footy Show and released Big Bad and Acoustic with re-recorded versions of their earlier work. In 2007 they resurfaced to bring out their next studio album, So Easy, which contained cover versions of The Easybeats songs. Gable said, "We thought it a worthwhile exercise to explore them in a more modern light. We could redo things with a greater technical capacity [...] we could put in backgrounds that two-track recording wouldn't allow. With Pretty Girl, for example, we spent quite a bit of time, adding about 80 backing vocals around the lead".

Gable hosted a radio show, Vega Sunday Session, on Vega 95.3 FM Sydney and Melbourne. The show featured local and international artists talking about their lives and their music. On 25 October, The Choirboys performed "Run to Paradise" at the Gold Coast SuperGP (formerly Indy Carnival). They released a second compilation, Never Gonna Die – The Very Best of Choirboys 30th Anniversary (2009), and followed with a national tour into 2010.
Gable as of 2012 hosts his own radio show The Awesome Eighties on 107.7 2GO (2GGO) FM Central Coast. The show which is aired 5 days a week consists of interviews and insight into the music and the artists of the 1980s.

On 17 December 2021 the band announced through their social media pages that drummer Lindsay Tebbutt had died from mesothelioma.

Members

Current members
Mark Gable – lead vocals, rhythm guitar (1979–present)
Ian Hulme – bass guitar, backing vocals (1979–present)
Brett Williams – lead guitar, backing vocals (1987–1992, 2010–present)

Former members
Lindsay Tebbutt – drums, backing vocals (1979–1992, 2010–2021; died 2021)
Brad Carr – lead guitar (1979–1987)
Bob Spencer – lead guitar (1992–2004)
Brad Heaney – drums (1993–1994)
Steve Williams – rhythm guitar (1993–1995)
Barton Price – drums (1994–1996)
Richard Lara – rhythm guitar (1995–1999)
Tony Le Rhodes – drums (1996–1997)
Richard Coleman – drums (1997–2003)
Johnny Ghiselli – rhythm guitar (2002–2003)
Rohan Cannon – rhythm guitar (2007)
Paul Wheeler – drums, backing vocals (2003–2009)
Mick O'Shea - drums, backing vocals (2009–2010)

Timeline

Discography

Studio albums

Live albums

Compilation albums

Singles

References
 
General
  Note: Archived [on-line] copy has limited functionality.
  Note: [on-line] version established at White Room Electronic Publishing Pty Ltd in 2007 and was expanded from the 2002 edition.
Specific

External links

Choirboys Early Years History, by Mark Gable
Short Choirboys Band History 1979–2005
 

New South Wales musical groups
Choirboys, The
Pub rock musical groups
Australian hard rock musical groups